Maria Yuryevna Zasypkina (Russian: Мария Юрьевна Засыпкина, born 9 December 1985) is a retired Russian artistic gymnast. She won a team silver medal at the 2001 World Championships and an individual bronze at the 2000 European Championships, on the vault. In November 2001 she sustained a severe spine injury and retired from gymnastics.

Zasypkina's mother is an engineer-designer working at Almaz-Antey. Her father is a retired competitive sprint runner. Her elder sister Anna is a retired competitive artistic gymnast.

Zasypkina shares surname with Svetlana Zasypkina, another Russian artistic gymnast who retired in 1988 after a similar spine injury. These events were presented in the film A Little Doll.

References

1985 births
Living people
Russian female artistic gymnasts
Sportspeople from Tula, Russia
21st-century Russian women